Naspe  is a town in Bumthang District in central Bhutan.

References

External links
Satellite map at Maplandia.com

Populated places in Bhutan